The Hartford Hellions were a soccer team based out of Hartford, Connecticut that played in the Major Indoor Soccer League.  They played from 1979 to 1981. The Hellions played their first season in the New Haven Coliseum before moving to the remodelled Hartford Civic Center. The team was conceived and owned by Glastonbury accountant William Chipman. The two seasons in Hartford the Hellions average 4,361 fans per game.

In May 1981, Athletes in Action purchased the Hellions and moved the team to Memphis, Tennessee.  The new owners renamed the Hellions the Memphis Americans.

Coaches
Hank Liotart – Head Coach 1979-80
 Hubert Vogelsinger – Technical Advisor 1979-80
Charlie McCully – Head Coach 1980-81

References

Defunct indoor soccer clubs in the United States
Soccer clubs in Connecticut
Major Indoor Soccer League (1978–1992) teams
1978 establishments in Connecticut
1981 disestablishments in Connecticut
Association football clubs established in 1978
Association football clubs disestablished in 1981